St John Rigby College (abbreviated as St.JR, SJR or simply John Rigby) is a sixth form college in the Orrell district of the Metropolitan Borough of Wigan, Greater Manchester situated in a  estate. As a college for students who intend to proceed into higher education, students are accepted from across the Metropolitan Borough of Wigan and Metropolitan Borough of Bolton areas of Greater Manchester as well as parts of Merseyside and Lancashire.

The school's A Level pass rate was 98% in 2009, well above the national average, as are its vocational courses at Levels 1, 2 and 3. Students go on to attend a wide range of universities across the UK and abroad. The college also works to promote Fairtrade and forming partnerships with people in other countries such as Brazil which is part of the work the college does with CAFOD, and also forming partnerships with other colleges with Loreto College, Manchester.

History
Originally a Christian Brothers boys' grammar school, and was named Blessed John Rigby RC Grammar School. John Rigby only being Beatified, not yet Canonized. In 1972 the school became a Sixth Form College under the trusteeship of the Roman Catholic Archbishop of Liverpool. In 2022 the college celebrated its 50th anniversary.

Saint John Rigby
St John Rigby College was named after the English Roman Catholic martyr John Rigby, who was executed during the reign of Elizabeth I. He is one of the Forty Martyrs of England and Wales.

Admittance to the college

Enrollment
Prior to the year of entry, application forms are distributed to High Schools in different areas, students who are looking to enroll at the college may attend an open evening. All students who accept a position to study at St. John Rigby College are invited to attend a New Students' Day in June.

Dependent upon the route taken will depend on the points necessary to guarantee a place in the college, (Route A) 40 Points, (Route B) 35 Points (Route C) 25 Points, (Route D) 15 Points. These will be calculated from the best 8 GCSEs which may be any or specific GCSEs that may be required to be included in the best 8 at a certain grade. (See below for points table):

Acceptance
If accepted, students can choose at what level they wish to study from. This consists of 5 levels:

Entry Level - Entry Level
Level 1 (Introductory Level) - NVQ Level 1, BTEC Introductory Award
Level 2 (Intermediate Level) - NVQ Level 2, BTEC First Diploma, GCSE
Level 3 (Advanced Level) - NVQ Level 3, BTEC National, AS and A Level
Level 3 (Degrees) - NVQ Level 4, BTEC Higher National, Foundational Degrees

As well as completing chosen courses, students are also required to study 'Values for living' and are also required to take on 'extended studies'. This can be a course completely different from the courses students have chosen to take (e.g., School Production, Driving Theory, First Aid). 
The majority of students who are enrolled at the college are aged 16–18 and are on Level 3 programs full-time. From here they then proceed to a range of universities across the UK.

Campus
The college is large consisting of 8 blocks (A Block - H Block) and is situated on a single campus 3.5 miles west of Wigan on Gathurst Road, Orrell, near the birthplace of the man for whom the school was named (St John Rigby). In February 2006 the College opened its new Learning Resource Centre (LRC) which offers a wide range of services and support to students.

Sports facilities
The College boasts the largest all weather football pitch in the country and has extensive playing fields surrounding the campus. The Sports Hall has facilities for a wide range of sports, a fitness suite, as well as being used by students, the pitch is also used by others outside the college (e.g. Wigan Athletic F.C. have used the pitch in the past for practice).

College Chapel
As a Roman Catholic school, students can visit the newly built College Chapel, which is available at any time of the day as a place of prayer, reflection or quietness. The college Chaplaincy team currently runs a Fairtrade store which is open to all students and staff.

SJR Community Team
The college is currently building up a community team involving a large number of students getting involved with open days, college events such as Rigfest (a night when student bands play their music) and getting involved with tea and coffee mornings and working with the chaplaincy team with other events.

The Learning Resource Centre (LRC)
The college Learning Resource Centre offers a wide range of service and support to students such as over 11,000 books in stock, DVDs and online resources.

Open Learning Centre (OLC)
In the Open Learning Centre, Students have access to over 96 network connected computers to aid them in their learning, with Computer Technicians available to help with any problems any time of the day.

Pearson Teaching Awards
In 2012, Physical education lecturer and head of department, Mr. John Ireland, was awarded the "Further Education Teacher of the Year Award in the North" in the Teaching Awards. He was awarded due to numerous nominations by students past and present, as a thank you for his 32 years of passionate teaching to students in sport, which has led to some of the most great successes, including students going on to play for top teams such as 'Wigan Warriors'.

Student Council
The college considers the student council to be a very important asset as it gives students the opportunity to have their say in which they think the quality of college life can be improved and also into any future plans the college intends to make. The student Council is a governing body who are representatives of the students and on their behalf put forward any suggestions of improvement that any students think should be considered as well as organising college events. The college is currently focusing on building up a council team in partnership with Loreto College in Manchester and always encourages its students to be involved.

Notable alumni
 Vincent Nichols, Archbishop of Westminster, former Chaplain
 Iain Coyle, TV presenter, TV producer and stand-up comedian
 Jon Culshaw, impressionist and comedian
 Shaun Edwards, Rugby League International/Welsh Union coach
 Mark Edwardson, BBC North West Tonight TV news presenter
 Eva Pope, Actress (Waterloo Road)
 Vernon Kay, TV presenter, DJ and former model
 Joe Lydon, Rugby League International
 Stuart Maconie, BBC Radio 2 DJ/TV presenter
 Luke Marsden, Big Brother 2008 (UK)
 Paul Rowley, BBC political correspondent
 Iain Thornley (Wigan Warriors Rugby league player)
 Sean O'Loughlin (Wigan Warriors Rugby League Captain)
 Phil Clarke (Sky Sports Rugby League Pundit, former Wigan and GB Player)
 Joe Burgess (Wigan Warriors) - Rugby Player
 Jennifer Reynolds, Actress (Coronation Street)

External links

 St John Rigby College Official Website
 College Prospectus for 2012

References

Buildings and structures in Wigan
Education in the Metropolitan Borough of Wigan
Sixth form colleges in Greater Manchester
Catholic universities and colleges in England
Educational institutions established in 1972
1972 establishments in England
Catholic secondary schools in the Archdiocese of Liverpool